Congresstrading.com is a commercial website that provides access to a database of financial disclosures of members of the United States Congress. It also provides a forum to discuss Congress’ stock trades, according to WXII 12, an NBC affiliate news station. Congress is required to publicly disclose their financial transactions by the STOCK Act.

History 
Since its founding in October 2020, congresstrading.com has been credited by various news organizations for providing and disclosing information related to financial transactions by members of Congress. In January 2021, the New York Times reported that Speaker Nancy Pelosi purchased Tesla stock options based on information sourced from congresstrading.com. In October 2021 CNBC, CNN, and the Washington Post reported that Congresswoman Marjorie Taylor Greene bought shares of Trump SPAC Digital World Acquisition Corp based on information provided by congresstrading.com.

References

External links
 

2020 establishments in the United States
Legislative branch of the United States government
Insider trading
American websites
Internet properties established in 2020
Online databases